The Gasconade Formation is a geologic formation in the Ozarks of Missouri. It preserves fossils dating back to the Ordovician Period.

Paleofauna

Monoplacophora
 Kirengella
 K. expansus
 Titanoplina
 T. meramecensis

See also 
 List of fossiliferous stratigraphic units in Missouri
 Paleontology in Missouri

References 

Geologic formations of Missouri
Ordovician System of North America
Ordovician Missouri
Ordovician southern paleotemperate deposits
Ordovician southern paleotropical deposits
Landforms of the Ozarks